A. Kalanithi (died 18 September 2020) was an Indian politician who served as Member of Parliament elected from Tamil Nadu. He was elected to the Lok Sabha as a Dravida Munnetra Kazhagam candidate from Central Chennai constituency in 1980 and 1984 elections. He died on September 18, 2020, due to cardiac arrest.

References 

Dravida Munnetra Kazhagam politicians
2020 deaths
India MPs 1980–1984
India MPs 1984–1989
Lok Sabha members from Tamil Nadu
Place of death missing
Place of birth missing
Politicians from Chennai
Year of birth missing